Elio Nicolas Firmino (born 30 January 2001) is a Brazilian footballer who plays as a midfielder for Atlanta United 2 in USL Championship.

Career

New England Revolution
In November 2018, Firmino signed a Homegrown Player Contract with the New England Revolution.

Firmino was loaned to the team's USL League One side New England Revolution II for the 2020 season. He made his pro debut on July 25, 2020 against Union Omaha, playing the full game. He scored his first professional goal on August 15 in a 3-3 draw with North Texas SC.

Following the 2020 season, New England opted to release Firmino.

Union Omaha
In April 2021, Firmino joined USL League One side Union Omaha ahead of the 2021 season.

Atlanta United 2
On 3 March 2022, Firmino moved to USL Championship side Atlanta United 2.

References

External links

 Profile at Revolution Official Site

2001 births
Living people
New England Revolution players
Hartford Athletic players
New England Revolution II players
USL League One players
Brazilian footballers
Association football midfielders
Brazilian expatriate footballers
Soccer players from Massachusetts
Homegrown Players (MLS)
Union Omaha players
Atlanta United 2 players
Brazilian expatriate sportspeople in the United States
Expatriate soccer players in the United States
People from Somerville, Massachusetts
Sportspeople from Middlesex County, Massachusetts